NWE Nos. 6 and 7, later Class 99.610, are narrow gauge tank locomotives with a C axle arrangement that belonged to the Nordhausen-Wernigerode Railway.

The two engines had been supplied to the Army Technical Research Institute (Heerestechnische Prüfungsanstalt) but were transferred in 1917 (superheated steam engine) and 1921 (saturated steam engine) to the Nordhausen-Wernigerode Railway as NWE 6 and NWE 7.

NWE 7 had previously worked as Locomotive No. 15 with the Nassau Light Railway.

Until the 1980s, both engines were used around Wernigerode by the Deutsche Reichsbahn, their last duties being in Rollbock service. The DR gave them new numbers following their nationalisation. Although they had been taken out of service, the Harz Narrow Gauge Railways took both engines over.

 Locomotive 99 6101, formerly NWE 6, now in the care of the Harz Narrow Gauge Railway Society (Interessengemeinschaft Harzer Schmalspurbahnen).
 Locomotive 99 6102, formerly NWE 7, now in the care of the Selke Valley Railway Society (Freundeskreis Selketalbahn).

Only 99 6101 is currently in working order.

Literature 
 Horst J. Obermayer: Taschenbuch Deutsche Schmalspur-Dampflokomotiven. Franckh, Stuttgart 1971, 
 Hans Röper, Helmut Becker, Werner Dill, Gerhard Zieglgänsberger: Die Harzquer- und Brockenbahn. 3., erweiterte Auflage, Transpress Verlagsgesellschaft, Berlin 1992

External links 
 99 6101 with the Selke Valley Railway Society
 99 6102 with the Selke Valley Railway Society

Private locomotives of Germany
NWE 06
C h2t locomotives
C n2t locomotives
Transport in the Harz
Metre gauge steam locomotives
Narrow gauge steam locomotives of Germany
Henschel locomotives